Darney is a small lunar impact crater that is located on the region of the Moon where the Mare Nubium joins the Oceanus Procellarum. It was named after French astronomer . To the south is the lava-flooded crater Lubiniezky.  The southern rim of Darney is attached to a series of low ridges that extend to the southwest.

This is a bowl-shaped formation with a small interior floor at the midpoint of the sloping inner walls.  The crater has a relatively high albedo compared to the surrounding dark lunar mare, and the crater is at the focus of a small ray system extending for 110 kilometers.

Satellite craters 
By convention these features are identified on lunar maps by placing the letter on the side of the crater midpoint that is closest to Darney.

References 

 
 
 
 
 
 
 
 
 
 
 

Impact craters on the Moon